Şalvar Davası (English: The Case of the Baggy Pants) is a 1983 Turkish film directed by Kartal Tibet and starring Müjde Ar and Şener Şen. The film, a loose adaptation of  the ancient Greek play Lysistrata by Aristophanes, was the first starring role for Şen.

Cast
Müjde Ar as Elif 
Sener Sen as Ömer Aga 
Halil Ergün as Recep 
Ihsan Yüce as Halil Emmi 
Tuncay Akça as Osman
Sevil Ustekin as Hatice 
Pembe Mutlu

Plot
Elif returns to her native village after her husband dies. When she comes back, she finds that nothing has changed. The village men still make their wives work hard while they sit in the cafes and gossip. Elif inspires the women to fight back against this unfair treatment, and they vow not to have sex with their husbands until they start working. Meanwhile, Elif clashes with her old flame Ömer Aga.

References

External links

Films set in Turkey
Films shot in Turkey
Turkish comedy films
1983 films
1980s Turkish-language films
Films based on works by Aristophanes
Films scored by Attila Özdemiroğlu
Works based on Lysistrata